The athletics events at the May 1925 Far Eastern Championship Games were held in Manila, Philippines. A total of 19 men's athletics events were contested at the competition. It was the first time that track events at this competition were conducted over the international standard metric distances, changing from the imperial distances that previously featured at the competition.

The Philippines returned to the top of the medal table in the athletics programme. The hosts won all but six of the nineteen events, placed in the top two in 16 of them, and completed medal sweeps in seven events. Japan was the next most successful nation, with five gold medals and medal sweeps in the triple jump and 1500 metres. China again performed poorly, matching their previous haul of two athletics medals of one gold and one bronze medal.

Fortunato Catalon aimed for a fifth straight sprint double, but teammate David Nepomuceno—who became the first Filipino Olympian a year earlier—defeated Catalon in the 200 metres title. Two other Filipinos defended their titles from 1923: Regino Birtulfo in the discus and Juan Taduran in the decathlon. Mikio Oda of Japan was the only other athlete to repeat as champion, retaining his triple jump crown. Chūhei Nambu followed in his compatriot's footsteps by taking medals in high, long and triple jump at one games. Both Oda and Nambu would go on to win Olympic triple jump titles (in 1928 and 1932, respectively). Wu Topan was China's only winner in the pentathlon.

Generoso Rabaya of the Philippines was the only athlete to claim two titles in the athletics and did so with an unusual combination of 110 metres hurdles and shot put (taking advantage of the lighter Asian implements in use).

Medal summary

References

Results
Far Eastern Championships. GBR Athletics. Retrieved on 2014-12-18.

1925
Far Eastern Championship Games
1925 Far Eastern Championship Games